William H. Shoudy (May 3, 1830 – September 19, 1901) was an American politician who served as the Mayor of Seattle from 1886 to 1887.

References

1830 births
1901 deaths
Mayors of Seattle